Reilly Opelka was the reigning champion, but was ineligible to compete this year.

Denis Shapovalov won the title, defeating Alex de Minaur in the final, 4–6, 6–1, 6–3.

Seeds

Draw

Finals

Top half

Section 1

Section 2

Bottom half

Section 3

Section 4

Qualifying

Seeds

Qualifiers

Draw

First qualifier

Second qualifier

Third qualifier

Fourth qualifier

Fifth qualifier

Sixth qualifier

Seventh qualifier

Eighth qualifier

External links

Boys' Singles
Wimbledon Championship by year – Boys' singles